The Sri Lanka cricket team toured Bangladesh in May 2021 to play three One Day International (ODI) matches. All of the matches took place at the Sher-e-Bangla National Cricket Stadium. The ODI series formed part of the inaugural 2020–2023 ICC Cricket World Cup Super League. Originally, the tour was scheduled to take place in December 2020. The Sri Lankan cricket team arrived in Bangladesh on 16 May 2021, following their two-match Test series in Sri Lanka.

Ahead of the tour, Kusal Perera was appointed as Sri Lanka's new ODI captain, replacing Dimuth Karunaratne.

Bangladesh won the first ODI by 33 runs. They also won the rain-affected second ODI by 103 runs, to take an unassailable lead in the series. It was Bangladesh's first bilateral series win against Sri Lanka. Sri Lanka won the third match by 97 runs with Bangladesh winning the series 2–1.

Squads

On 1 May 2021, Bangladesh named a preliminary squad of 23 players to begin training ahead of the series. Rubel Hossain and Hasan Mahmud, who were both named in the preliminary squad, were later ruled out of the ODI matches due to injuries. Mohammad Naim, Taijul Islam, Shohidul Islam and Aminul Islam were all named as standby players for Bangladesh, with Mohammad Naim being named in their squad for the third ODI.

Warm-up matches

ODI series

1st ODI

2nd ODI

3rd ODI

Statistics

Most runs

Most wickets (ODI)

Sri Lankan cricket team in England in 2021

References

External links
 Series home at ESPN Cricinfo

2021 in Bangladeshi cricket
2021 in Sri Lankan cricket
International cricket competitions in 2021
Sri Lankan cricket tours of Bangladesh